Chloroclysta is a genus of moths in the family Geometridae erected by Jacob Hübner 1825.

Species
 Chloroclysta concinnata (Stephens, 1831) – Arran carpet
 Chloroclysta guriata (Emich, 1873)
 Chloroclysta miata (Linnaeus, 1758) – autumn green carpet
 Chloroclysta siterata (Hufnagel, 1767) – red-green carpet

References

Cidariini